Val di Merse is one of the regions of the province of Siena, in Tuscany, on the border with the Upper Maremma. The territory comprises the area between the rivers Farma and Merse.

Notable monuments in the area include the Abbey of San Galgano. Villages in the region include Monticiano which is surrounded by the Nature Reserves of Alto Merse and Farma, in this village don't miss the Gothic Church of St Augustina the oldest monasteries of the Augustinian order, Chiusdino best known for San Galgano Abbey and the sword in the stone, Murlo which originated from Etruscans, Radicondoli where geothermal steam is present which can be used for the creation of clean energy, and Sovicille. The hot springs of Bagni di Petriolo are also in the region.

Athletes based at Tuscany Camp often train at Val di Merse.

References

Valleys of Tuscany